The 2022 Zadar Open was a professional tennis tournament played on clay courts. It was the second edition of the tournament which was part of the 2022 ATP Challenger Tour. It took place in Zadar, Croatia between 21 and 27 March 2022.

Singles main-draw entrants

Seeds

 1 Rankings are as of 14 March 2022.

Other entrants
The following players received wildcards into the singles main draw:
  Hamad Međedović
  Mili Poljičak
  Dino Prižmić

The following players received entry from the qualifying draw:
  Matteo Arnaldi
  Riccardo Balzerani
  Cezar Crețu
  Daniel Michalski
  Carlos Sánchez Jover
  Miljan Zekić

Champions

Singles

 Flavio Cobolli def.  Daniel Michalski 6–4, 6–2.

Doubles

 Zdeněk Kolář /  Andrea Vavassori def.  Franco Agamenone /  Manuel Guinard 3–6, 7–6(9–7), [10–6].

References

2022 ATP Challenger Tour
2022 in Croatian sport
March 2022 sports events in Croatia